James Wilson  was an Anglican priest in Ireland, most notably Dean of Elphin and Ardagh from 1954 to 1963.

Wilson was educated at Trinity College, Dublin and ordained deacon in 1900 and priest in 1903. After  curacies in Clontibret, Trory and Tyholland he held incumbencies at  Brantry, Columbkille, Drumcliff and Lissadell. He was Prebendary of Tibohine in Elphin Cathedral from 1949 to 1953.

References

20th-century Irish Anglican priests
Deans of Elphin and Ardagh
Alumni of Trinity College Dublin